The Nederlandse Muziekprijs (Dutch Music Award) is the highest honor bestowed by the Dutch Ministry of Education, Culture and Science to a musician working in classical music.

The prize is awarded on the recommendation of the Advisory Committee for the Dutch Music Prize. The prize was initially given by the Fund for Amateur Art and Performing Arts (Fonds Amateurkunst en Podiumkunsten, FAPK), after 2007 by the Dutch Fund for Performing Arts+ (Nederlands Fonds voor Podiumkunsten+), and since the beginning of 2010 by the Performing Arts Fund (Fonds Podiumkunsten). This committee follows the candidate intensively for a period of two years, during which the candidate undertakes a study program agreed by the committee. At the end of the study process, the committee decides after a concert or exam whether to award the prize.

Winners

1981 Hans Roelofsen (contrabass)
1984 Ronald Brautigam (piano)
1984 Jard van Nes (mezzosoprano)
1985 Wout Oosterkamp (bass-baritone)
1987 Martijn van den Hoek (piano)
1987 Olga de Roos (saxophone)
1988 Jacob Slagter (horn)
1989 Theodora Geraets (violin)
1991 Arno Bornkamp (saxophone)
1992 Pieter Wispelwey (cello)
1993 Manja Smits (harp)
1994 Quirine Viersen (cello)
1996 Godelieve Schrama (harp)
1997 Geert Smits (baritone)
1999 Pauline Oostenrijk (oboe)
2003 Janine Jansen (violin)
2004 Jörgen van Rijen (trombone)
2006 Liza Ferschtman (violin)
2007 Gwyneth Wentink (harp)
2008 Christianne Stotijn (mezzosoprano)
2009 Lavinia Meijer (harp)
2009 Bram van Sambeek (bassoon)
2010 Ties Mellema (saxophone)
2010 Erik Bosgraaf (recorder)
2010 Izhar Elias (guitar)
2010 Henk Neven (baritone)
2012 Rick Stotijn (contrabass)
2016 Hannes Minnaar (piano)
2016 Remy van Kesteren (harp)
2017 Rob van de Laar (horn)
2018 Peter Gijsbertsen (tenor)
2018 Maria Milstein (violin)
2019 Dominique Vleeshouwers (percussion)
2020 Lucie Horsch (recorder)
2020 Sebastiaan Kemner (trombone)

References

 Webpage for the Nederlandse Muziekprijs on the website of the Performing Arts Fund

Classical music awards
Dutch awards
European music awards